Resistance (also referred to as backlash) to diversity efforts in organizations is a well-established and ubiquitous phenomenon that may be characterized by thoughts, feelings, or behaviors that undermine the success of diversity-related organizational change initiatives to recruit or retain diverse personnel. The use of such initiatives may be referred to as diversity management. Scholars note the presence of resistance to diversity before and after the civil rights movement; as pressures for diversity and social change increased in the 1960s, dominant group members (i.e. Whites) faced workplace concerns over displacement by minorities.

In the workforce, resistance to diversity is often studied as resistance to organizational change, which can be construed as hostile and intentional, as well as a subtler occurrence. Some scholars have deemed the "resistance perspective" as reactive, highlighting psychological and behavioral consequences such as denial, avoidance, defiance or manipulation that serve to maintain the status quo. Other scholars define resistance to diversity as the behavior of both individuals and organizations that may undermine diversity-driven opportunities for "learning and effectiveness", whether intentional or not.

Who is resisting

Research on resistors 
Research on resistance to diversity has revealed insight into resistors and under which circumstances they resist. Focusing on resistance from the dominant, non-minority group, some have linked diversity resistance to White male backlash  or straight, white, American male (SWAM) backlash, although the research may focus on the study of resistance from Whites or men in the context of the research question.

Resistance to workplace racial diversity 
Research has documented that some Whites may be resisting the diversity messages of multiculturalism-based ideologies that embrace ethnic differences between groups or colorblind-based ideologies that ignore the ethnic differences between groups—common ideological options for managing diversity in the workforce. Other research found members of high-status groups (i.e. Whites) reacted adversely to pro-diversity organizational messages when compared with non-Whites. This research found White people experience heightened threat in response to pro-diversity messages, and that this threat manifests in physiological (cardiovascular reactions), psychological (self-disclosed concerns), and behavioral (making poorer impressions) domains.

Resistance to workplace gender diversity 
Researchers have observed some men will resist gender diversity under certain conditions; the researchers presented men in the fields of science, technology, engineering, and mathematics (STEM) with information that diversity initiatives will effectively increase female representation, which led to resistance among men who believed there is legitimacy to men best-representing STEM (i.e. prototypicality legitimacy) and those who also had concerns about losing the ability to best represent STEM (prototypicality threat).

Popular examples 
In 2017, attention was given to the technology industry in light of James Damore's document "Google's Ideological Echo Chamber", which went viral as a prominent example of perceived "anti-diversity" attitudes. The document says Google's current diversity initiatives discriminate against dominant group members (i.e. Whites and males) and foster tension within the organization. In 2016, it was reported that Intel's CEO was threatened in response to his diversity efforts, and Facebook's CEO faced challenges with what he considered the malicious behavior of his employees replacing a "black lives matter" message with an "all lives matter" message.

Scholars and other commentators have also highlighted media-covered examples of resistance to diversity outside of technology, including a Texaco racial discrimination suit in which top-level executives were accused of creating a hostile climate for their diverse employees and were recorded on tape using racial slurs, and the Southern Company racial discrimination lawsuit that included popularized reports of nooses displayed in the facilities.

Possible explanations

General processes of resisting diversity 
Some scholars propose that resistance to diversity can generally be understood to be a result of evolved cognitive processes that impact relations between different groups in society. They point to a disconnect between the once-adaptive way humans evolved sensitivity to group differences (e.g. "us" versus "them" tribal boundaries) and some current social environments that contain unprecedented levels of diversity. They propose resistance to diversity may stem from the conflict between automatic social categorization and modern heterogeneous social environments.

Identity threats 
As companies attempt to grow diverse workforces and train them to work harmoniously, research suggests minority group progress may induce a threat response from those in the majority group. Researchers Major and Kaiser argue these types of diversity initiatives jeopardize status hierarchies and that this status instability produces threat, even within well-meaning, "prodiversity" progressives.

Racial progress has been shown to negatively impact Whites' self-worth; Whites may buffer this impact by perceiving anti-white bias (i.e. racial discounting). Similarly, researchers have observed increases in social identity threat among men who discuss the instability of men's high status (i.e. changing gender-status relations) with women's.

Another possible threat-related mechanism that could underlie resistance to diversity is prototypicality threat, or the threat that one's sub-group will no longer best represent the broader, superordinate group.

Feelings of exclusion 
Although multicultural ideology is commonly used in workplaces, research suggests White individuals may associate multiculturalism with exclusion and may not readily associate multiculturalism with conceptions of the self. This program of research also found the degree to which Whites feel included, relative to minorities, can help explain racial differences in diversity endorsement. Plaut et al suggest socially contextualized cues to inclusion or exclusion can meaningfully impact resistance to diversity.

In response to the association between multiculturalism and feelings of exclusion among members of dominant groups, scholars have called for the use of All-Inclusive Multiculturalism (AIM), or multiculturalism that explicitly includes the dominant group. These researchers noted that whether non-minorities are included or excluded in an article about multiculturalism can implicitly influence their inclusionary associations with the ideology.

Problems with diversity efforts 
Commentators and scholars have speculated that diversity training may itself be creating backlash because employees may feel uncomfortable in training environments or resent being told what to do. When examining the sources of resistance to diversity efforts, researchers have said organizations often use negative, legal-focused deterrents within bias training, designate diversity training as mandatory, and associated the training with corrective action for "problem groups".

Consistent with this thinking, researchers documented evidence of a "counter-response" (i.e. rebellion/defiance) when administering brochures or priming participants with controlling conceptualizations of prejudice-reduction, compared with autonomy-supporting conceptualizations. The controlling conceptualizations focused on the need to reduce prejudice and comply with norms of non-prejudice, whereas the autonomy-supporting conceptualizations focused on drawing attention to the choice and personal value involved in non-prejudice. Finding negative outcomes associated with the controlling conditions, they said common organizational efforts to reduce prejudice via control may be unintentionally increasing resistance.

References 

Majority–minority relations
Affirmative action
Civil disobedience
Workplace
Men's studies
Employment discrimination
Sociology of culture
White culture